Cancelieri is a surname of Itlaian origin. Notable people with this surname include:

 Annamaria Cancellieri (born 1943), former Italian minister of Interior and the former justice minister
 Francesco Cancellieri (1751-1826), Italian writer, librarian, and erudite bibliophile
 Innocenzo Del Bufalo-Cancellieri (1566-1610), Roman Catholic cardinal
 Monika Cancellieri (born 1976),  Hungarian pornographic actress and fetish model
 Pietro Cancellieri, also known as Pietro Cavalieri (died 1580), Roman Catholic Bishop of Lipari 
 Rainaldo Cancellieri, Roman Catholic Bishop of Sant'Angelo dei Lombardi
 Valerio Cancellieri (died 1574), Italian Roman Catholic Bishop of Sant'Angelo dei Lombardi e Bisaccia

See also 
 Cancello (disambiguation)
 Palazzo Ganucci Cancellieri, a late-Mannerist-style palace located in central Pistoia, Tuscany, Italy